In Greek mythology, Melera was the daughter of Zeus and Pandora II, daughter of Deucalion and Pyrrha. Her brother was Pandorus, and possibly Graecus and Latinus.

Notes

References 

 Hesiod, Catalogue of Women from Homeric Hymns, Epic Cycle, Homerica translated by Evelyn-White, H G. Loeb Classical Library Volume 57. London: William Heinemann, 1914. Online version at theio.com
 Pseudo-Clement, Recognitions from Ante-Nicene Library Volume 8, translated by Smith, Rev. Thomas. T. & T. Clark, Edinburgh. 1867. Online version at theio.com

Children of Zeus
Demigods in classical mythology
Deucalionids
Thessalian mythology